Andrés Díaz (born 1964) is a Chilean cellist, who performs with the Díaz Trio, which includes his brother Roberto Díaz, a violist, and violinist Andrés Cárdenes, former concertmaster of the Pittsburgh Symphony Orchestra. He won the First Prize in the 1986 Naumburg International Cello Competition.

Career
Díaz's orchestral appearances include engagements with the Atlanta Symphony, performances with the American Symphony at Carnegie Hall, the symphony orchestras of Milwaukee, Seattle, Rochester, the Boston Pops and Esplanade Orchestras, the Chicago Symphony at the Ravinia Festival and the National Symphony Orchestra. He has toured Taiwan, Hong Kong, Korea, Japan, Hawaii and Canada, and appeared in Chile, Venezuela, Argentina, and the Dominican Republic. 

He has also appeared with Russia's Saratov Symphony and toured in New Zealand with the New Zealand Chamber Orchestra. He is currently a professor at Southern Methodist University.

Personal life
Diaz is married to Julie Diaz and has two sons, Peter and Gabriel. He is the brother of violist Roberto Diaz.

External links
Andrés Díaz's web site

1964 births
American classical cellists
Boston University faculty
Chilean emigrants to the United States
Living people
Musicians from Santiago
New England Conservatory alumni
Southern Methodist University faculty